This is a list of ships of the Swedish Navy.

Auxiliary ships
 , later Hjälparen, stricken 1962
 , broken up 1960s
 , stricken 1993
 , was previously the minelayer MUL 12
 , was previously the minelayer MUL 15
 
 
 
 
 
 
 
 
 
 
 
 
 
 
 
 
 
 
 
 
 
 
 
 
 
 
 
 
 
 
 
 
 , previously (MUL 20) and (20)
 
 
 
 
 
 
 
 
 
 
 
 
 
 
 
 
 
 
 
 
 
 
 
 
HSwMS Marieholm, renamed SS Marieholm.

Battleships
 , launched 1824
 , launched 1856

Coastal defence ships
 
  (1885) - retired in 1941
  (1889) - retired in 1923
  (1893) - retired in 1923
 
  (1896) - retired in 1937
  (1898) - retired in 1937
  (1898) - retired in 1922
  (1900) - stricken in 1947 and broken up 1961
 
  (1901) - stricken in 1947 and broken up 1961
  (1901) - stricken in 1940 and broken up 1961
  (1901) - stricken in 1947 and broken up 1952
  (1903) - stricken in 1950 and pontoon 1956
  (1905) - stricken in 1950 and broken up 1974
 
  (1915) - stricken in 1953 and broken up 1958 
  (1917) - stricken in 1957 and broken up 1960
  (1918) - stricken in 1957 and broken up 1970

Cruisers
 
 , sunk as target 1950
 , sold for breaking up 1924
 , sold 1949, broken up 1951
 , sunk as target 1939
 , sunk 1917

  launched 1944, stricken 1964
  launched 1945, sold to Chile 1971

Others
 , sold 1957, broken up
 , stricken 1959, broken up 1961
 , stricken 1960, broken up 1962

Destroyers

 , stricken 1963
 , stricken 1963

  (ex-Giovanni Nicotera), stricken 1947, broken up 1949
  (ex-Bettino Ricasoli), stricken 1947, broken up 1949

 , stricken 1958
 , sunk 1941

  (ex-Spica), stricken 1958
  (ex-Astore), stricken 1958

 
 

 
 
 
 

 
 

 
 
 
 

 
 
 
 
 
 

 , formerly (9), stricken 1947, sunk as target 1960
 , stricken 1947, broken up 1951

 
 
 
 

 , stricken 1940, sunk as target
 , later (23) stricken 1947, sunk 1961
 , later (22), stricken 1947, broken up 1951
 , later (21), stricken 1947, broken up 1951

 , later (24), stricken 1947, broken up 1949
 , stricken 1940, broken up ~1943

Others
 , stricken 1928, sunk as target 1936
 , stricken 1936, target, broken up 1944
 , stricken 1940, sunk as target 1946

Frigates

 , launched 1862, broken up 1945

Corvettes

Historical
Sailing corvettes
 
 
 
 
 

Steam-corvettes

Motor torpedo boats

T41, converted to the picket boat 
T42, converted to the picket boat 
T43, converted to the picket boat 
T44, converted to the picket boat 

T48, converted to the picket boat 

T50, converted to the picket boat 
T51, converted to the picket boat

Missile boats

HSwMS Norrköping (R131)
HSwMS Nynäshamn (R132)
HSwMS Norrtälje (R133)
HSwMS Varberg (R134)
HSwMS Västerås (R135)
HSwMS Västervik (R136) 
HSwMS Umeå (R137)
HSwMS Piteå (R138)
HSwMS Luleå (R139)
HSwMS Halmstad (R140)
HSwMS Strömstad (R141)
HSwMS Ystad (R142)

HSwMS Norrköping (R131)
HSwMS Nynäshamn (R132)
HSwMS Piteå (R138)
HSwMS Luleå (R139)
HSwMS Halmstad (R140)
HSwMS Ystad (R142)

Monitors
 
  (1865) - sold in 1919
  (1865) - sold in 1922
  (1866) - Sold for scrap in 1922
  (1869) - scrapped in 1908
  (1867) - sold for scrap in 1893
  (1868) - sunk as a target in 1907
  (1872) - retired in 1903
 
  (1872) - sold in 1919
  (1872) - retired in 1919
  (1873) - sold in 1919
  (1874) - sold in 1919
  (1874) - sold in 1919
  (1875) - sold in 1919
  (1875) - decommissioned in 1919

Patrol vessels
 HSwMS Jägaren (P150), reclassified to picket boat (vedettbåt) in 1988

Torpedo boats

Submarines
 URF

 
 
 

 
 
 
 

 
 
 

 
 
 
 
 

 
 
 
 
 
 
 

 
 
 
 
 
 
 

 
 
 
 , rebuilt as the attack submarine HSwMS Forellen (U4)
 , rebuilt as the attack submarine HSwMS Aborren (U5)
 , rebuilt as the attack submarine HSwMS Siken (U6)
 , rebuilt as the attack submarine HSwMS Gäddan (U7)
 , rebuilt as the attack submarine HSwMS Laxen (U8)
 , rebuilt as the attack submarine HSwMS Makrillen (U9)

 (1942-1966)
 , stricken 1966
 , stricken 1966
 , stricken 1966

 (1938-1964)
 , stricken 1959
 , stricken 1964
 , stricken 1960
 , stricken 1959
 , stricken 1964
 , stricken 1959
 , stricken 1963
 , stricken 1964
 , stricken 1959

Delfinen class (1936-1953)
 , stricken 1953, sold 1957, broken up
 , stricken 1953, sold 1958, broken up
 , stricken 1953, sold 1956, broken up

 (1929-1948)
 , stricken 1948
 , stricken 1947
 , mined 1943

 (1925-1944)
 , stricken 1944

  (1921-1944)
 , stricken 1944, broken up 1956
 , sunk 1943, salvaged, broken up 1944
 , stricken 1944, broken up

 (1917-1943)
 , stricken 1943, broken up 1944
 , stricken 1942, broken up 1946
 , stricken 1943, broken up 1944

 (1916-1937)
 , stricken 1937
 , stricken 1937

 (1914-1936)
  (S), stricken 1936, broken up 1946
  (T), stricken 1936, broken up 1946

 (1914-1935)
 , stricken 1935
 , stricken 1931

others
 , stricken 1922
 , stricken 1919, sunk as target
 , stricken 1930

Minelayers
 
 
 HSwMS Visborg (M03), later (A265)
 HSwMS Carlskrona (M04), later (P04)
 , previously (MUL 11)
 , previously (MUL 12)
 , previously (MUL 13)
 , previously (MUL 14)
 , previously (MUL 15)
 , previously (MUL 16)
 , previously (MUL 17)
 , previously (MUL 18)
 , previously (MUL 19)
 HSwMS Furusund (20), previously (MUL 20), now (A320)

Minehunters

 
 
 
 
 
 
 

 
 
 
 

 - remodeled from the Styrsö class.
 
 

 - remodeled from the Landsort class.

Minesweepers

Minesweepers, Trawler type

Coastal minesweepers

 
 , reclassified to picket boat (vedettbåt) in 1979
 , reclassified to picket boat (vedettbåt) in 1979
 , reclassified to picket boat (vedettbåt) in 1979
 , reclassified to picket boat (vedettbåt) in 1979

M series

M3 – M14 (39-båtarna)

M15 – M26 (40-båtarna)

Picket boats
 
 
 
 
 , previously the motor torpedo boat T42
 , previously the motor torpedo boat T43
 , previously the motor torpedo boat T44
 , previously the motor torpedo boat T41
 , previously the motor torpedo boat T47
 , previously the motor torpedo boat T48
 , previously the motor torpedo boat T50
 , previously the motor torpedo boat T11

Type III

Reclassified torpedo boats

Reclassified minesweepers

 HSwMS Tärnö (V52)
 HSwMS Tjurkö (V53)
 HSwMS Sturkö (V54)
 HSwMS Ornö (V55)

Auxiliary picket boats

 Hjvb 232 (Isbjörn) 
 Hjvb 282 (Libanon) 
 Hjvb 356 (Barry) 
 Hjvb 356 (Condor) 
 Hjvb 356 (Ocean)

Sonar buoy ships

Training ships
 
 HSwMS af Chapman

Transport ships

Other

See also 
 List of active Swedish Navy ships

Bibliography

 
Ships of the Swedish Navy
Ships list